Al-Wafd ( meaning the Mission in English) is the daily newspaper published by the Wafd party in Giza, Egypt.

History and profile
Al-Wafd was launched in 1984. As the house organ of the liberal-democratic neo-Wafd party, the paper is considered an opposition paper, although both party and paper have oscillated between support and opposition for the regime.

It is one of the highest circulated papers among those dailies owned by a political party in the country. The circulation of the daily in 2000 was 600,000 copies. The 2005 circulation of the daily was 180,000 copies.

Mohamed Ali Ibrahim was named as the editor-in-chief of the paper in 2005. Then Abbas Al Tarabili served as the editor-in-chief until February 2009. During the Egyptian revolution in 2011 Osama Heikal was the editor-in-chief. He was appointed information minister in July 2011.

The paper has also an online version, called Al Wafd Gate.

Controversy
Abbas Al Tarabili, then chief editor of the daily, was fired in February 2009 due to low circulation rates that were between 9,000 and 10,000.

On 4 September 2013, the paper portrayed the US President Barack Obama as Satan due to his support for opposition forces in Syria.

See also

 List of newspapers in Egypt

References

External links
 Official website

1984 establishments in Egypt
Publications established in 1984
Arabic-language newspapers
Daily newspapers published in Egypt
Egyptian nationalism
Mass media in Giza
National liberalism